Sonny Stitt with Strings: A Tribute to Duke Ellington is an album by American jazz saxophonist Sonny Stitt featuring performances of compositions associated with Duke Ellington recorded in 1977 for the Catalyst label.

Reception

The Allmusic site awarded the album 3 stars, stating, "No real surprises occur although the string charts are a cut above the usual. Stitt is at his most melodic and really romps on a few of these pieces".

Track listing
 "Take the "A" Train" (Billy Strayhorn) - 3:44
 "Prelude to a Kiss" (Duke Ellington, Irving Gordon, Irving Mills) - 4:17
 "It Don't Mean a Thing (If It Ain't Got That Swing)" (Ellington, Mills) - 4:35
 "Cotton Tail" (Ellington) - 5:14
 "In a Sentimental Mood" (Ellington, Mills, Manny Kurtz) - 4:09
 "In a Mellow Tone" (Ellington, Milt Gabler) - 4:43
 "Jeep's Blues" (Ellington, Johnny Hodges) - 5:43

Personnel
Sonny Stitt - tenor saxophone, alto saxophone
Gildo Mahones - piano
Allen Jackson - bass 
Clarence Johnston - drums 
String section arranged and conducted by Bill Finegan

References

1977 albums
Catalyst Records (jazz) albums
Sonny Stitt albums
Duke Ellington tribute albums